Phelim Reagh MacDavitt or Phelim Reagh MacDevitt (Irish: Feidhlimidh Riabhach Mac Dhaibheid, or Brindled Felim - probably a reference to a white streak or streaks in his hair) was a Gaelic Irish warrior and landowner notable for his participation in the Nine Years War and later in O'Doherty's Rebellion in 1608. After playing a leading part in the Burning of Derry, he was captured and executed following the Battle of Kilmacrennan.

Tyrone's Rebellion
The MacDavitts were from Inishowen, in northern Donegal, directly north of the English bastion of Derry. They were foster brothers (some sources say foster fathers) of Cahir O'Doherty, who had the strongest claim to succeed as head of the O'Dohertys. When Red Hugh O'Donnell kidnapped Cahir during Tyrone's Rebellion, Phelim Reagh and his brother Hugh Boy MacDavitt changed sides, having previously supported the Irish cause. They now rescued Cahir from captivity and had him proclaimed head of the O'Dohertys by Henry Docwra, English governor of Derry. Both Cahir and his foster brothers served with distinction on the Crown's side during the war. They were disappointed when the Treaty of Mellifont 1603 restored lands to the rebels that had been promised to them.

Both Cahir O'Doherty and Phelim Reagh had problems with local government officials in the years after the war, once the more friendly Docwra had been replaced, and both felt they were being pushed into rebellion by their treatment. This came to a head when O'Doherty was ordered to hand over Phelim Reagh because he wanted for arrest over allegations that had been made. O'Doherty reluctantly turned him over, but applied for his release. Eventually his lobbying was successful, and he was freed, just in time for him to take part in the rebellion.

O'Doherty's Rebellion

Burning of Derry

O'Doherty planned to begin the rebellion by seizing the garrison town of Derry. MacDavitt helped lead the initial attack and capture of the Upper Fort of Derry. He was on hand when the Governor George Paulet (who was disliked by both Protestant settlers and Gaelic inhabitants) was killed. Derry was then burned to the ground.

Kilmacrennan

MacDavitt was at the decisive battle fought near Kilmacrennan where O'Doherty was killed and the rebels suffered a heavy defeat. After the battle, MacDavitt was cornered by a group of soldiers. He put up fierce resistance and was wounded and captured.

MacDavitt was the most senior rebel to be executed. He was taken to Lifford, found guilty by a civilian court, and sentenced to be hanged, drawn and quartered. His and O'Doherty's severed heads were exhibited on spikes on at the gates of Dublin, a common revenge on those accused of treason at the time.

The participation of Phelim Reagh MacDavitt and others of the MacDavitts in the attack and destruction of Derry led to them becoming known as the "burn-Derrys".

References

Bibliography
 Bardon, Jonathan. The Plantation of Ulster. Gill & MacMillan, 2012.
 Falls, Cyril. Elizabeth's Irish Wars. Constable, 1996.
 McCavitt, John. The Flight of the Earls. Gill & MacMillan, 2002.
 McGurk, John. Sir Henry Docwra, 1564-1631: Derry's Second Founder. Dublin: Four Courts Press, 2006.

17th-century Irish people
Irish soldiers
People of O'Doherty's rebellion
People of Elizabethan Ireland
People from County Donegal
Ireland
People executed by Stuart Ireland
1608 deaths